Display code is the six-bit character code used by many computer systems manufactured by Control Data Corporation, notably the CDC3000 series and the following CDC 6000 series in 1964.  The CDC 6000 series and their successors had 60 bit words.  As such, typical usage packed 10 characters per word.  It is a six-bit extension of the four-bit BCD encoding, and was referred to as BCDIC (BCD interchange code.)

There were several variations of display code, notably the 63-character character set, and the 64-character character set.  There were also 'CDC graphic' and 'ASCII graphic' variants of both the 63- and 64-character sets.  The choice between 63- or 64-character character set, and between CDC or ASCII graphic was site-selectable.  Generally, early CDC customers started out with the 63-character character set, and CDC graphic print trains on their line printers.  As time-sharing became prevalent, almost all sites used the ASCII variant - so that line printer output would match interactive usage.  Later CDC customers were also more likely to use the 64-character character set.

A later variation, called 6/12 display code, was used in the Kronos and NOS timesharing systems in order to support full ASCII capabilities.  In 6/12 mode, an escape character (the circumflex, octal 76) would indicate that the following letter was lower case.  Thus, upper case and other characters were 6 bits in length, and lower case characters were 12 bits in length.

The PLATO system used a further variant of 6/12 display code.  Noting that lower case letters were most common in typical PLATO usage, the roles were reversed.  Lower case letters were the norm, and the escape character preceded upper case letters.

The typical text file format used a zero-byte terminator to signify the end of each record.  The zero-byte terminator was indicated by, at least, the final twelve bits of a 60-bit word being set to zero.  The terminator could actually be anywhere from 12- to 66-bits long - depending on the length of the record.  This caused an ambiguity in the 64-character character set, when a colon character needed to be the final character in a record.  In such cases a blank character was typically appended to the record after the trailing colon.

Display code characters (64-character character set version)

6/12 display code 

The NOS 6/12 display code is one of the character sets used on CDC Cyber NOS computers to represent all ASCII characters.

Further reading

External links
 Charsets for CDC machines

Character sets
Control Data Corporation software